XHSCCI-FM is a community radio station on 105.7 FM in Pedernales, a community in the municipality of Tacámbaro, Michoacán, Mexico. The station is owned by the civil association Comunicación para el Desarrollo Social de la Comunidad de Pedernales, A.C.

History
Comunicación para el Desarrollo Social de la Comunidad de Pedernales filed for a community station on May 12, 2016. The station was awarded on February 20, 2019. Radio Pedernales had been operating as a pirate station on 93.3 FM.

References

Radio stations in Michoacán
Community radio stations in Mexico
Former pirate radio stations
Radio stations established in 2019